Don't Blink is a 2014 American psychological horror film written and directed by Travis Oates.  It stars an ensemble cast that includes Mena Suvari, Brian Austin Green, Joanne Kelly, and Zack Ward, who also produced.  A group of ten friends visit a remote resort, which they subsequently find empty.  As they attempt to find out what happened to the other guests, they are horrified to find that they too are disappearing.  It received a limited release on September 18, 2014.

Plot 
A group of ten friends – Jack, his girlfriend Tracy, and her brother Lucas; Alex, his friend Sam, and Sam's girlfriend Charlotte; Claire and Amelia, friends of Tracy; Jack's ex-girlfriend Ella and her new boyfriend, Noah – arrive at an isolated resort far from civilization.  Each of the cars is near-empty from the long drive, and nobody has cell service.  When they attempt to refill their cars, they find the gasoline tanks locked.  Nobody is at the resort, though they find half-eaten food, unpacked luggage, and a car at the pumps, apparently left idling until running out of gas and draining the battery.  They cannot find the keys for the gas pumps or any landline phones.  Jack urges them to remain calm and organizes several parties to search the area for the missing people.

Alex and Claire head to the lake, Tracy and Jack check cabins to the left, and Lucas and Amelia check cabins to the right.  The rest stay at the resort, where they continue looking for clues.  The other cabins are similarly empty, though Alex and Claire find the lake has frozen over despite the unseasonably warm weather at the resort.  They further realize that there are no insects or animals in the entire area.  When the friends regroup, Alex insists they leave immediately.  They discuss pooling their gas together into one vehicle, but Jack suggests they stay, as the resort has supplies and the pooled gas will only take them halfway.  The situation becomes even more tense when Tracy disappears.

Now worried about Tracy, Jack refuses to leave, and a majority of the others vote to stay.  Although angry, Alex backs off and warns Jack that anything else that happens is his fault.  As the friends debate what to do and search for Tracy, Lucas and Noah disappear, too.  Alex retrieves a pistol from his car, and, after Amelia disappears, Sam steals Alex's pistol.  Disturbed and panicked, Sam shoots Alex in the shoulder and forces Charlotte to join him as he drives off.  His car only goes a few feet before he disappears, along with the keys.  Charlotte, who was in the car with him when he disappeared, enters a catatonic state.  Alex threatens to kill her unless she explains what she saw, but Jack stops Alex by punching him.

The remaining friends return to the resort, where they agree to watch each other closely.  Ella, a nurse, bandages Alex.  Jack and Ella comfort each other, and after Jack escorts Ella upstairs, they have sex.  When Jack turns away from her, Ella disappears.  Noah surprises them by knocking on the door, and Alex interrogates him.  When Noah claims to have simply fallen in a ditch and wandered back to the resort, Alex shoots him in the leg despite Claire's objections.  Noah continues to profess his ignorance, and Alex shoots him again.  Jack  protests, but Alex points out that it is too late for him to protest, as he had already tacitly given his approval to torture.  Claire convinces Alex to stop, but Alex kicks Noah out of the resort.  When his cries suddenly end, they assume he has also disappeared.

Alex says the impending threat of nonexistence invalidates morality.  After casually threatening to murder them, he commits suicide to leave behind evidence of his own existence.  When they turn away, his corpse vanishes.  After a novelty phone rings, Claire calls for help; the police tell her it will take three hours to arrive.  Claire and Jack agree to look into each other's eyes until help arrives.  When they lose power, they light candles.  Jack, Claire, and Charlotte enter the bathroom when Claire says she must urinate, and Charlotte announces her own disappearance.  Shocked, Claire and Jack watch each other in a mirror until they experience microsleep and Jack disappears.  Claire panics but soon realizes that the emergency services have arrived.  A man in black assures her that the situation is under control.  After she is loaded in a patrol car, she is horrified to find that she is suddenly all alone and all the emergency workers are nowhere to be seen.

Cast 
 Mena Suvari as Tracy
 Brian Austin Green as Jack
 Joanne Kelly as Claire
 Zack Ward as Alex
 Fiona Gubelmann as Ella
 David de Lautour as Noah
 Leif Gantvoort as Sam
 Emelie O'Hara as Amelia
 Curtiss Frisle as Lucas
 Samantha Jacober as Charlotte
 Robert Picardo as Man in Black

Production 
Shooting took place in Ruidoso, New Mexico. It lasted from January 9 until February 1, 2010. As a fan of Hitchcock, Oates incorporated homage into the film. The role of Alex was written for Zack Ward, who is Oates' friend. Oates said that the lack of answers in the film's conclusion would divide audiences, but he found it more scary to have the reasons subtly hinted at instead of explicitly revealed. The concept grew out of Oates' desire to write a horror film with no villain, no blood, and no deaths. The snow was unplanned and was worked into the script during production.

Release 
Vertical Entertainment gave the film a limited release on September 18, 2014.

Home media
The film was released on DVD by Vertical Entertainment on October 14, 2014. Vertical would later re-release the film on August 28, 2019.

Reception 

Mark L. Miller of Ain't It Cool News wrote, "Some may be frustrated with the lack of answers here, but if you’re willing to look a little outside of the box in terms of movie monsters, this one is going to be a pleaser." Sarah Boslaugh of Playback wrote, "All in all, Don’t Blink is no cinematic masterpiece, but it's an OK horror movie perfect for home viewing with a group of friends."  Gordon Sullivan of DVD Verdict wrote, "It's an okay little supernatural mystery, but those looking for a quick ride or a tight plot might be disappointed."

References

External links 
 
 
 

2014 films
2014 horror films
American psychological horror films
Films shot in New Mexico
2010s English-language films
2010s American films